From Memphis to Mobile is one of a pair of albums by freelance tenor saxophonist, songwriter, producer, and University of Central Florida jazz professor Jeff Rupert, featuring Kenny Drew Jr. on the piano.

Track listing
All songs written and arranged by Jeff Rupert except where noted.

Personnel
 Jeff Rupert - Tenor saxophone; primary composer; producer
 Kenny Drew Jr. - Piano
 Lyman Brodie - Flugelhorn
 Richard Drexler - Bass
 John K. Jenkins Sr. - Drums

References

External links

2009 albums
Jazz albums by American artists